Bingham is a suburb of Edinburgh, the capital of Scotland. It is east of Duddingston, west of Magdalene, south of Portobello and north of Niddrie. The main A1 road skirts Bingham to the north.

References

Sources
(Google Maps)

Areas of Edinburgh